Kenneth Tralnberg (born July 17, 1956 in Prince Albert, Saskatchewan) is a Canadian curler and Olympic medallist.  He received a silver medal at the 2002 Winter Olympics in Salt Lake City. He lives in St. Albert, Alberta.

He was the coach for the Swiss Women's Curling team at the 2010 Winter Olympics in Vancouver as well as their coach at the 2014 Winter Olympics in Sochi.

References

External links 
 

1956 births
Living people
Olympic curlers of Canada
Curlers at the 2002 Winter Olympics
Olympic silver medalists for Canada
Curlers from Alberta
Olympic medalists in curling
Medalists at the 2002 Winter Olympics
Sportspeople from St. Albert, Alberta
Sportspeople from Prince Albert, Saskatchewan
Canadian male curlers
Métis sportspeople
Canadian curling coaches